Matteo Spreafico (born 15 February 1993) is an Italian cyclist, who is provisionally suspended from the sport, following a positive drugs test.

In October 2020, he was named in the startlist for the 2020 Giro d'Italia. On 22 October 2020, the UCI announced that Spreafico had returned two Adverse Analytical Findings (AAF) for Enobosarm at the Giro d'Italia, and was provisionally suspended. He was sacked by his team, .

Major results

2011
 4th Overall Tre Ciclistica Internazionale Bresciana
2014
 4th Trofeo Edil C
2016
 10th Overall Tour of Bulgaria
2017
 7th Overall Tour of China II
2018
 1st  Overall Vuelta a Venezuela
1st Stage 5 (ITT)
 7th Overall Tour of China II
 10th Overall Tour de Hongrie

Grand Tour general classification results timeline

References

External links

1993 births
Living people
Italian male cyclists
Cyclists from the Province of Como